Zavarygin is a rural locality (a khutor) in Medvedevskoye Rural Settlement, Ilovlinsky District, Volgograd Oblast, Russia. The population was 113 as of 2010. There are 2 streets.

Geography 
Zavarygin is located in steppe, on  Volga Upland, on the left bank of the Tishanka River, 35 km southeast of Ilovlya (the district's administrative centre) by road. Medvedev is the nearest rural locality.

References 

Rural localities in Ilovlinsky District